Edmund Michał Piszcz (17 November 1929 – 22 March 2022) was, from 22 October 1988, the bishop of Warmia, Poland. On 25 March 1992, he was promoted to the rank of archbishop, together with his diocese, the Archbishopric of Warmia. He retired on 30 May 2006.

He was awarded the German Bundesverdienstkreuz (Großes Verdienstkreuz des Verdienstordens der Bundesrepublik Deutschland) on 28 October 2004 for supporting German-Polish understanding, in e.g. keeping contacts to the members of Federation of Expellees from Ermland (Warmia).

References

1929 births
2022 deaths
Commanders Crosses of the Order of Merit of the Federal Republic of Germany
Commanders of the Order of Polonia Restituta
Bishops of Warmia
20th-century Roman Catholic bishops in Poland
20th-century Roman Catholic archbishops in Poland
21st-century Roman Catholic archbishops in Poland
People from Bydgoszcz